Farooka (Urdu : فروکہ) is a city in Sargodha (Urdu: سرگودھا), located in the Punjab province of Pakistan.

References
 

Tehsils of Punjab, Pakistan
Populated places in Sargodha District